James Tucker (born 5 August 1994) is a New Zealand rugby union player who currently plays as a lock or loose forward for  in New Zealand's domestic Mitre 10 Cup.

Early career

Born in Christchurch, Tucker moved to Sydney, Australia while he was a primary school student, but moved back to the land of his birth during high school and attended St Bede's College in his home town where he played first XV rugby.   He moved north to Hamilton after graduating from high school and started playing club rugby for the Hamilton Marist club in Waikato's Club Rugby competition.

Senior career

Tucker was first named in the  squad for the 2014 ITM Cup, however due to knee and shoulder injuries, he didn't get any game time during the season and had to wait until the following year for his provincial debut.   He played 9 times for Waikato in a season in which they claimed the Ranfurly Shield and he was named as Waikato Supporters Club forward of the year.   2016 proved to be another tough year for him, with an ACL knee injury sustained in week 2 against  ruling him out for the rest of the year.

Super Rugby

Having been a member of the Chiefs development squad and trained with their first team in 2015, Tucker was promoted to the franchise's wider training group for the 2016 Super Rugby season. Despite injury ruining his 2016 domestic season, he was named as a full squad member for 2017.

International

Tucker was a member of the New Zealand Under-20 side which finished in 3rd place in the 2014 IRB Junior World Championship in his home country.

Super Rugby Statistics

Cricket

In addition to being a fine rugby player in high school, Tucker also played cricket, representing Canterbury at age group level and New Zealand at under-19 level.

References

1994 births
Living people
New Zealand rugby union players
Rugby union locks
Rugby union flankers
Waikato rugby union players
Chiefs (rugby union) players
Rugby union players from Christchurch
People educated at St Pius X College, Sydney
People educated at St Bede's College, Christchurch
Zebre Parma players
Toshiba Brave Lupus Tokyo players
ACT Brumbies players
Blues (Super Rugby) players